Portslade Aldridge Community Academy (PACA) (formerly Portslade Community College) is a secondary school led by Dr Alby Barrett with academy status located in Portslade, in the city of Brighton and Hove, England. It was rated Good  by Ofsted in December 2016. The school has around 900 pupils. It is part of the Aldridge Education multi-academy trust.

In June 2015 the Governors at Portslade Aldridge Community Academy announced the appointment of Elliott Fuller as the new Principal at PACA.

The school is involved in the Aldridge Cricket Academy which allows students from Brighton Aldridge Community Academy or Portslade Aldridge Community Academy to combineacademic studies with an intensive cricket development programme.

Brighton Aldridge Community Academy and Portslade Aldridge Community Academy also recently partnered up with Latest TV to offer a new digital media academy to students called the Brighton Digital Media Academy (BDMA), which launched in September 2015.

Location and history 
Portslade Aldridge Community Academy is located on Chalky Road in Portslade. It was previously located over three sites, however £12.7 million was invested in extending the Chalky Road site to include a dance studio, community library, sixth form and STEM Centre, completed in 2014.
 Main school (Chalky Road site) 
The Chalky Road site was previously known as Portslade Secondary Modern School for Girls, (circa 1947) and then later Mile Oak Girls School, (circa 1954). The school was renamed Portslade Community College in the 1970s, and was opened by Margaret Thatcher, while Secretary of State for Education.

Sixth Form Centre 
The sixth form centre is now situated on the main Chalky Road site in the new £12.7 million campus that has recently been built. Previously, it was located about a mile away from the main site, at the top of Portslade High Street. This site has also been used in the past for Windlesham School, Portslade Secondary Modern, and Portslade Community College Lower School. The Sixth Form college was previously located within the old Mile Oak Approved school in the 1960s and 1970s, in Mile Oak Road.

Move to academy status
In 2009, an OFSTED inspection judged the overall effectiveness of the school "inadequate" and found that "Standards are exceptionally low".  A further inspection led to the decision that the school required special measures.

The Aldridge Foundation, led by Rod Aldridge, expressed an interest in 2009 in sponsoring PCC to become an academy, in the same way that it had sponsored the academy at Falmer High School.  This was approved by the Department for Education and finally agreed by the City Council in February 2011.

The council report proposing the closure of PCC to make way for the academy stated that to leave PCC unchanged was "not considered acceptable as in discussions with the DfE it has been agreed that the school requires significant structural change to improve the results achieved by the school". The sum of £12.7 million will be available to the academy which will enable the sixth form provision to be moved to the main site at Mile Oak, as well as providing new science facilities.

Academic results 
In 2015 they reported their best ever results with 60% of students achieving 5 GCSEs at grade A*-C including English and Maths, 78% achieving A* to C grades in English and 68% achieving A* to C grades in maths.

In 2013 there were vast improvements in the results compared to previous years, with 60% of students achieving 5 GCSEs at grade A*-C including English and Maths, placing PACA as one of the top ten most improved schools in the country with an increase of +21%.

Previously, it had been as low as 25% of students achieved Level 2 (5+ A*-C) including English and maths GCSEs, in 2009, compared with 44% across all Brighton and Hove schools.  In 2010, this had risen to 35%.

Adult education 
The adult education centre within the school was shortlisted, as one of four institutions, for an "Education Oscars" event organised by the Centre for Excellence in Leadership.

In 2006, 645 adult students gained a qualification with the school.

References

External links 
 Portslade Aldridge Community Academy official website

Secondary schools in Brighton and Hove
Academies in Brighton and Hove